The 1983 Mid-American Conference baseball tournament took place from May 19 through 21. The top two regular-season finishers from each division met in the double-elimination tournament held at Hyames Field in Kalamazoo, Michigan. This was the third Mid-American Conference postseason tournament to determine a champion. Fourth seeded  won their first tournament championship to earn the conference's automatic bid to the 1983 NCAA Division I baseball tournament.

Seeding and format 
The top two finishers from each division, based on conference winning percentage only, participated in the tournament. The top seed from each division played the second seed from the other division in the double-elimination tournament.

Results

References 

Tournament
Mid-American Conference Baseball Tournament
Mid-American Conference baseball tournament
Mid-American Conference baseball tournament